The Bible: In the Beginning... is a 1966 religious epic film produced by Dino De Laurentiis and directed by John Huston. It recounts the first 22 chapters of the Biblical Book of Genesis, covering the stories from The Creation and Adam and Eve to the binding of Isaac.

Released by 20th Century Fox, the film's ensemble cast features Huston, Michael Parks, Richard Harris, Franco Nero, Stephen Boyd, George C. Scott, Ava Gardner, Peter O'Toole and Gabriele Ferzetti. The screenplay was written by Christopher Fry, with uncredited contributions by Orson Welles, Ivo Perilli, Jonathan Griffin, Mario Soldati and Vittorio Bonicelli, photographed by Giuseppe Rotunno in Dimension 150, a variant of the 70mm Todd-AO format. The musical score was by the Japanese composer Toshiro Mayuzumi, with additional cues by an uncredited Ennio Morricone.

Premiering in New York City on 28 September 1966, the film received generally positive reviews from critics. The National Board of Review of Motion Pictures included the film in its "Top Ten Films" list of 1966. De Laurentiis and Huston won David di Donatello Awards for Best Producer and Best Foreign Director, respectively. Toshiro Mayuzumi's score was nominated for an Academy Award and a Golden Globe. The film was originally conceived as the first in a series of films retelling the entire Old Testament, but these sequels were never made.

Plot

The film consists of five main sections: The Creation, Garden of Eden, Cain and Abel, Noah's Ark, and the story of Abraham. There are also a pair of shorter sections, one recounting the building of the Tower of Babel, and the other the destruction of Sodom and Gomorrah. The sections vary greatly in tone. The story of Abraham is somber and reverential, while that of Noah repeatedly focuses on his love of all animals. Cats (including lions) are shown drinking milk and Noah's relationship with the animals is depicted as harmonious.

Cast

 John Huston as the narrator, Noah and the voice of God
 Michael Parks as Adam
 Ulla Bergryd as Eve
 Flavio Bennati as Serpent
 Richard Harris as Cain
 Franco Nero as Abel
 Stephen Boyd as Nimrod
 George C. Scott as Abraham
 Ava Gardner as Sarah
 Peter O'Toole as The Three Angels
 Zoe Sallis as Hagar
 Gabriele Ferzetti as Lot
 Eleonora Rossi Drago as Lot's Wife
 Pupella Maggio as Noah's Wife
 Robert Rietti as Abraham's Steward
 Peter Heinze as Shem
 Maria Grazia Spina as Lot's Daughter
 Angelo Boscariol as Ham
 Claudie Lange as Nimrod's Wife
 Anna Orso as Shem's Wife
 Adriana Ambesi as Lot's Daughter
 Eric Leutzinger as Japheth
 Gabriella Pallotta as Ham's Wife
 Alberto Lucantoni as Isaac
 Rossana Di Rocco as Japheth's Wife
 Luciano Conversi as Ishmael
 Giovanna Galletti as Sinful Woman
 Lars Bloch as Archangel Michael
 Ivan Rassimov as Babylonian Dignitary

Production
Seven Arts Productions contributed 30% of the budget.

Casting
Ava Gardner was reluctant at first to play the part of Sarah, but after Huston talked her into it, she accepted. She later explained why she accepted the role:

He (Huston) had more faith in me than I did myself. Now I'm glad I listened, for it is a challenging role and a very demanding one. I start out as a young wife and age through various periods, forcing me to adjust psychologically to each age. It is a complete departure for me and most intriguing. In this role, I must create a character, not just play one.

Anglo-Persian actress Zoe Sallis, who was cast as Hagar, was originally known as Zoe Ishmail, until Huston decided that she change her name because of its similarity to the name of Ishmael, her character's son.

Ulla Bergryd was an anthropology student living in Gothenburg, Sweden when she was discovered by a talent scout, who photographed her in a museum there, and then promptly hired to play Eve. In an interview for The Pittsburgh Press, Bergryd recalled the experience:

I was especially surprised by the fact that I started to work four days after signing a contract. Although I've always been interested in movies and the theater, I'd never seen any actual shooting, and it was all very exciting.

Huston originally considered Alec Guinness (who was unavailable) and Charlie Chaplin (who declined) for the part of Noah until he finally decided to play it himself.

The film marks the debut of Italian actress Anna Orso, who portrays the role of Shem's wife. It also introduced Franco Nero to American audiences; Nero, who was working as the film's still photographer, was hired by Huston for the role of Abel due to his handsome features. At the time, Nero could not speak English, and Huston gave him recordings of Shakespeare with which to study.

Filming
The scenes involving the Garden of Eden were shot at a "small zoological garden" in Rome instead of a "beautiful place of trees, glades and wildflowers" which had been demolished shortly before the shooting began. Ulla Bergryd, who was cast as Eve, later recalled, "Paradise was, in fact, an old botanical garden on the outskirts of Rome."

There were five reproductions of Noah's Ark built for the film. The largest reproduction, which stood on the backlot of the De Laurentiis Film Center, was 200 feet long, 64 feet wide, and 50 feet high; it was used for the long shot of Noah loading the animals. The interior reproduction, which was one of the "largest interior sets ever designed and constructed," was 150 feet long and 58 feet high and had "three decks, divided into a hundred pens" and a ramp that ran "clear around the ark from top to bottom." The third reproduction was a "skeleton" ark, built for the scenes depicting Noah and his sons constructing the Ark. The fourth reproduction was "placed at the foot of a dam" for the inundation sequences and the fifth reproduction was a miniature for the storm sequences. The cost of building the five reproductions was more than $1 million. The building took months and more than 500 workers were employed. The animals were delivered from a zoo in Germany. The whole segment of Noah's Ark had a total budget of $3 million.

The opening Creation sequence was shot by renowned photographer Ernst Haas.

Release
The Bible: In the Beginning... premiered at New York City's Loew's State Theatre on 28 September 1966. The day after the premiere, Ava Gardner remarked, "It's the only time in my life I actually enjoyed working—making that picture."

Critical reception
Philip K. Scheuer of the Los Angeles Times wrote, "Director John Huston and his associates have wrought a motion picture that is not only magnificent almost beyond cinematic belief but that is also powerful, quaint, funny, thought-provoking and of course, this being the Old Testament, filled with portents of doom." Variety noted that "the world's oldest story—the origins of Mankind, as told in the Book of Genesis—is put upon the screen by director John Huston and producer Dino De Laurentiis with consummate skill, taste and reverence." It also commended the "lavish, but always tasteful production [that] assaults and rewards the eye and ear with awe-inspiring realism."

Other reviews were less positive. Bosley Crowther of The New York Times wrote that the film had "extraordinary special effects" but was lacking "a galvanizing feeling of connection in the stories from Genesis," and "simply repeats in moving pictures what has been done with still pictures over the centuries. That is hardly enough to adorn this medium and engross sophisticated audience." Richard L. Coe of The Washington Post described the film as "cautiously literary, impressive in some instances, absurd in others." The Monthly Film Bulletin opined that "the seven or eight episodes are diffusely long, tediously slow, depressingly reverent. The liveliest of the lot is The Ark, with Huston himself as a jolly, Dr. Dolittle old Noah, and a lot of irrestistibly solemn and silly animals; but even here sheer length eventually wears down one's attention." Episcopal priest and author Malcolm Boyd wrote, "Its interpretation of Holy Scripture is fundamentalistic, honoring letter while ignoring (or violating) spirit. John Huston got bogged down in material of the Sunday School picture-book level and seems unable to have gotten out of the rut. It is an over-long (174 minutes plus intermission) picture, tedious and boring." In Leonard Maltin's annual home video guide the film is given a BOMB rating, its review stating, "Only Huston himself as Noah escapes heavy-handedness. Definitely one time you should read the Book instead."

Box office
The film earned rentals of $15 million in the United States and Canada during its initial theatrical release, which made it the second highest-grossing film of 1966.

The film was the second most popular Italian production in Italy in 1966 with 11,245,980 admissions, just behind The Good, the Bad and the Ugly, and is the 15th most popular of all-time.

According to Fox records, the film needed to earn $26,900,000 in rentals to break even and made $25,325,000 worldwide (as of December 11, 1970), making a loss of $1.5 million.

Awards and nominations 

The film is recognized by American Film Institute in these lists:
 2006: AFI's 100 Years...100 Cheers – Nominated

Home media 
20th Century Fox released the film on videocassettes during the later 1970s, 1980s and 1990s, DVD in 2002, Blu-ray Disc on 22 March 2011 and online for both permanent downloading and streaming video online rentals.

See also
List of American films of 1966

References

Bibliography

External links
 
 
 
 

1966 films
1960s English-language films
20th Century Fox films
Films based on the Book of Genesis
Films directed by John Huston
Films shot in Ecuador
Religious epic films
Films based on the Bible
Films shot in Rome
Films shot in Sardinia
Book of Genesis
Cultural depictions of Adam and Eve
Cultural depictions of Abraham
Cultural depictions of Noah
Cultural depictions of Cain and Abel
Noah's Ark in film
Babylon
Tower of Babel
Sodom and Gomorrah
Films about brothers
1966 drama films
Films produced by Dino De Laurentiis
Films scored by Ennio Morricone
Nimrod
Italian drama films
English-language Italian films
American epic films
Fratricide in fiction
1960s American films
1960s Italian films